|}

The Victoria Cup is a flat handicap horse race in Great Britain open to horses aged four years or older. It is run over a distance of 7 furlongs (1,408 metres) at Ascot in May.

The Victoria Cup was first run over 2 miles at Hurst Park in 1901, becoming a 7 furlong handicap race from 1908. It was run at Hurst Park until the course closed in 1962 and was transferred to Ascot from the 1963 running, where it has been run ever since apart from a single race at Newbury in 1964.

Winners since 1988
 Weights given in stones and pounds.

See also
 Horse racing in Great Britain
 List of British flat horse races

References

Racing Post:

Flat races in Great Britain
Ascot Racecourse
Open mile category horse races
Recurring sporting events established in 1901